Neuronal migration protein doublecortin, also known as doublin or lissencephalin-X is a protein that in humans is encoded by the DCX gene.

Function 

Doublecortin (DCX) is a microtubule-associated protein expressed by neuronal precursor cells and immature neurons in embryonic and adult cortical structures. Neuronal precursor cells begin to express DCX while actively dividing, and their neuronal daughter cells continue to express DCX for 2–3 weeks as the cells mature into neurons. Downregulation of DCX begins after 2 weeks, and occurs at the same time that these cells begin to express NeuN, a neuronal marker.

Due to the nearly exclusive expression of DCX in developing neurons, this protein has been used increasingly as a marker for neurogenesis. Indeed, levels of DCX expression increase in response to exercise, and that increase occurs in parallel with increased BrdU labeling, which is currently a "gold standard" in measuring neurogenesis.

Doublecortin was found to bind to the microtubule cytoskeleton. In vivo and in vitro assays show that Doublecortin stabilizes microtubules and causes bundling. Doublecortin is a basic protein with an iso-electric point of 10 typical of microtubule-binding proteins.

Knock out mouse 

In mice where the Doublecortin gene has been knocked out, cortical layers are still correctly formed. However, the hippocampi of these mice show disorganisation in the CA3 region. The normally single layer of pyramidal cells in mutants is seen as a double layer. These mice also have different behavior than their wild type littermates and are epileptic.

Structure 

The detailed sequence analysis of Doublecortin and Doublecortin-like proteins allowed the identification of a tandem repeat of evolutionarily conserved Doublecortin (DC) domains. These domains are found in the N terminus of proteins and consists of tandemly repeated copies of an around 80 amino acids region. It has been suggested that the first DC domain of Doublecortin binds tubulin and enhances microtubule polymerisation.

Doublecortin has been shown to influence the structure of microtubules. Microtubule nucleated in vitro in the presence of Doublecortin have almost exclusively 13 protofilaments, whereas microtubule nucleated without Doublecortin are present in a range of different sizes.

Interactions 

Doublecortin has been shown to interact with PAFAH1B1.

Clinical significance 

Doublecortin is mutated in X-linked lissencephaly and the double cortex syndrome, and the clinical manifestations are sex-linked. In males, X-linked lissencephaly produces a smooth brain due to lack of migration of immature neurons, which normally promote folding of the brain surface.  Double cortex syndrome is characterized by abnormal migration of neural tissue during development which results in two bands of misplaced neurons within the subcortical white, generating two cortices, giving the name to the syndrome; this finding generally occurs in females. The mutation was discovered by Joseph Gleeson and Christopher A. Walsh in Boston. At least 49 disease-causing mutations in this gene have been discovered.

See also
 Lissencephaly

References

Further reading

External links

 GeneReviews/NCBI/NIH/UW entry on DCX-Related Disorders
  OMIM entries on DCX-Related Disorders
 
 

Protein families
Proteins